Anju is a Korean term for food consumed with alcohol. It consists of a variety of foods, including both main dishes and side dishes. Consuming food with alcohol is a widespread practice in Korea, especially when the alcoholic beverage soju is involved. 

Certain types of foods consumed primarily as anju include golbaengi muchim, nogari with peanuts, and jokbal.

History

Since the introduction of beer and Western foods into Korea, mainly from Japan in the nineteenth century, bars and pubs have enjoyed a newfound popularity, and many types of Western foods have been consumed as anju.

By types of beverage 
Some foods are considered to be best complemented by certain types of alcohol. For example, samgyeopsal, grilled pork belly, is considered to go best with soju, while fried chicken or Korean seasoned chicken goes well with beer.

By the place where alcohol is served
There are a number of different types of bars in South Korea, and each category sells different kinds of food and alcoholic beverages.

: this does not refer to the traditional Korean inns of the Chosun Dynasty mentioned above, but instead refers to a conceptual bar based on Korean culture. These bars are represented by traditional anju such as pa-jun, dubu-kimchi, or dotori-muk.
Hof house: Hof houses (a German loan word) sell a number of relatively inexpensive alcoholic beverages. Various international dishes are served here as well.
Pojangmacha: It is a place where tents are placed on the side of the road and snacks and alcohol are sold. Mainly simple side dishes are sold.

Sample images

See also 

 Aahaan kap klaem (Thai drinking food)
Sakana (Japanese drinking snacks or small plates)
 Pulutan (Filipino drinking food)
 Tapas (Spanish drinking snacks or small plates)
 Meze (Eastern Mediterranean small plates sometimes served with alcoholic drinks)
 Korean alcoholic beverages

References

Further reading

Korean cuisine
Appetizers